Magazine is the first studio album by the Japanese singer, model and actress Meisa Kuroki. It was released on January 26, 2011 in 3 editions: two CD+DVD editions (Type A comes with a music video compilation since her first music video "Like This" and Type B comes with a footage from her first solo live "Attitude 2010") and a Regular edition. The album ranked #5 in Oricon Daily Chart and #6 in Oricon Weekly Chart with 16,238 copies sold in the first week.

Track listing

Charts

Oricon Chart

Sources 

2011 albums
Japanese-language albums
Meisa Kuroki albums